Sterling Landing (also called Sterling) is an extinct town in Lincoln County, in the U.S. state of Missouri. The GNIS classifies it as a populated place.

Sterling Landing was platted in 1836, and named after a riverboat captain.

References

Ghost towns in Missouri
Former populated places in Lincoln County, Missouri